The South Wales Mounted Brigade was a formation of the Territorial Force of the British Army, organised in 1908.  After home defence service, it was posted to Egypt, where it was absorbed into the 4th Dismounted Brigade in March 1916.

History

Formation

Under the terms of the Territorial and Reserve Forces Act 1907 (7 Edw.7, c.9), the brigade was formed in 1908 as part of the Territorial Force.  It consisted of three yeomanry regiments, a horse artillery battery and ammunition column, a transport and supply column and a field ambulance.

As the name suggests, the units were drawn from the South Wales area, with the exception of the field ambulance which was based in Hereford, England.

Mobilisation for World War I
The brigade was mobilised on 4 August 1914 at the outbreak of the First World War, assembled at Hereford and moved to East Anglia by the end of August 1914.  It joined the 1st Mounted Division in August 1914, replacing 1st South Midland Mounted Brigade which moved to 2nd Mounted Division.  In November 1915, the brigade was dismounted.  It was replaced in 1st Mounted Division by 2/1st Eastern Mounted Brigade when it departed for Egypt.

Egypt
The brigade was posted to Egypt in March 1916.  On 20 March, South Wales Mounted Brigade was absorbed into the 4th Dismounted Brigade (along with the Welsh Border Mounted Brigade).  4th Dismounted Brigade was later renamed as 231st Brigade in the 74th (Yeomanry) Division.

Commanders
The South Wales Mounted Brigade was commanded from 1 January 1913 by Colonel Frederick Fryer. He was promoted to brigadier general on 5 August 1914.

See also

 2/1st South Wales Mounted Brigade for the 2nd Line formation
 British yeomanry during the First World War

References

Bibliography
 
 
 
 
 

SWa11
Military units and formations established in 1908
Military units and formations disestablished in 1916